LOTV may refer to:
League of Technical Voters, a 501(c)(3) non-profit organization
StarCraft II: Legacy of the Void, a 2015 video game expansion pack